Crescent Island is a member of the Queen Elizabeth Islands and the Arctic Archipelago in the territory of Nunavut. It is an irregularly shaped island located at the northern mouth of the Penny Strait, and west of Napier Bay, Devon Island.

References

Islands of the Queen Elizabeth Islands
Uninhabited islands of Qikiqtaaluk Region
Islands of Baffin Bay